Tokawa also known as Lotawa. Tokawa and Lotawa are actually the naugburing villages. They were the part of Daudpur(Dewaitha) bu were layer, made new village. They were before known as Nishadpur when they wete in Daudpur.

References

Villages in Ghazipur district